MarkAir  was a regional airline based in Anchorage, Alaska, that became a national air carrier operating passenger jet service in the United States with a hub and corporate headquarters located in Denver, Colorado. After a second bankruptcy in 1995, it ceased operations in October and was later liquidated.

History

The airline began its operations as Interior Airways in late 1946 carrying cargo throughout the American territory of Alaska. In the late 1960s the airline bought Lockheed L-382 Hercules aircraft to service construction of the Alaska Pipeline. In 1972 it changed its name to Alaska International Air to reflect its international charter business. In 1980 Alaska International Air bought a regional passenger/cargo airline named Great Northern Airways. In 1984 new colors and the name MarkAir (reportedly named after a newsboy named Mark) were brought to the airline as it inaugurated passenger/cargo service from Anchorage to the Alaska bush communities of Barrow, Bethel, Dillingham, Fairbanks, King Salmon, Kotzebue, Nome, and Prudhoe Bay/Deadhorse. The airline had purchased Boeing 737-200 Combi cargo/passenger aircraft to operate these services.

In the mid-1980s, MarkAir and Alaska Airlines entered into a codesharing agreement with MarkAir operating as Alaska Airlines to the communities of Dillingham, Dutch Harbor, Barrow, Aniak, St. Mary's and Alaska Airlines feeding MarkAir from its routes from Seattle and other "lower 48" destinations. In the late 1980s MarkAir bought several air taxis (airlines operating small six to nine seat aircraft from larger communities such as Bethel to Alaska's Native villages) and purchased several Beechcraft 1900 aircraft; and under the name of MarkAir Express operated new service from Anchorage to Cordova, Aniak, McGrath, Dillingham, King Salmon, Galena, Unalakleet, Kodiak, Kenai, Homer and Valdez. By 1990 MarkAir was the State of Alaska's largest airline.

In 1990, Alaska Airlines abruptly cancelled its codesharing agreement with MarkAir and MarkAir inaugurated service in key Alaska Airlines markets such as Anchorage-Seattle, Anchorage-Juneau-Sitka-Ketchikan-Seattle, Seattle-Los Angeles, Seattle-San Francisco and Seattle-Portland. In 1992 the airline expanded its lower 48 route network to include Seattle-Chicago/Midway and Denver. However, the head-to-head competition with Alaska Airlines, although it forced major cuts with the latter, following Alaska Airlines' loss post of US$121 million, caused MarkAir to find itself in bankruptcy by the end of 1992. In 1993, MarkAir restructured itself as a "low fare" carrier and cut most routes out of Seattle with the exception of Seattle-Anchorage and Seattle-Los Angeles. The airline established a hub in Denver and served various West Coast, Midwest, East Coast and Southern cities. In 1994, city and business officials from Denver, Colorado hoped to persuade MarkAir to move its headquarters to Denver.

In 1995, faced with bankruptcy again, the airline cut all jet services within the state of Alaska and in order to concentrate on its Denver hub, which was the new location of the new MarkAir headquarters. MarkAir Express (known to the locals and the competition as "Skidmark") continued services within the state of Alaska, taking over all of MarkAir's jet routes. MarkAir was forced to shut down in 1995 and MarkAir Express was reorganized in 1996 into the all-cargo carrier Alaska Central Express.

MarkAir's assets were purchased in bankruptcy by the private equity firm Wexford Capital Management, the majority owners in control of the present day Republic Airways Holdings.

KEY DATES IN THE HISTORY OF NEIL BERGT AND MARKAIR ---------------------------------------------------

-- May 1971: Neil Bergt is named president and chief executive of Interior Airways, a 24-year-old cargo carrier that just reorganized under Chapter 11 bankruptcy protection.

-- May 1974: Bergt makes Interior Airways, now renamed Alaska International Air (AIA), profitable and forms holding company Alaska International Industries (AII).

-- November 1981: Bergt creates Eagle International Corp. and makes a $50 million bid to purchase Wien Air Alaska from Household International.

-- December 1981: Bergt is named chairman and chief executive of Western Airlines. Simultaneously, Western announces it plans to purchase Wien from Bergt's Eagle International for about $80 million in stock once Eagle purchases it from Household.

-- October 1982: Civil Aeronautics Board approves merger of Western and Wien, but only if Bergt surrenders control of AIA for at least 18 months.

-- October 1982: Household sues Bergt for backing out of deal to purchase Wien.

-- April 1983: Bergt resigns from Western.

-- March 1, 1984: Bergt launches MarkAir in Anchorage, offering passenger and cargo service, but only to Alaskan cities.

-- November 1991: MarkAir expands outside Alaska, establishes Anchorage-Seattle route, triggering fare war with Alaska Airlines and other carriers.

-- June 1992: MarkAir files for Chapter 11 bankruptcy protection.

-- November 1992: Bankruptcy court judge allows MarkAir to continue operating by expanding further into the Lower 48.

-- June 1993: The airline emerges from bankruptcy proceedings, offering service from Alaska to New York.

-- January 1994: MarkAir establishes Seattle reservations office.

-- March 1994: The airline emerges from bankruptcy, offering service from Alaska to New York.

-- November 1994: Mark Air reports first profitable quarter since it went head-to-head against Alaska.

-- March 1995: The state of Alaska denies MarkAir's request for $40 million in loan guarantees; MarkAir says it will lay off 300 employees.

-- April 1995: MarkAir files for Chapter 11 bankruptcy protection again, announces it will no longer fly in Alaska and lays off an estimated 600 of its 1,200 employees. It establishes new hub at Denver International Airport.

-- May 1995: MarkAir staves off IRS attempt to force liquidation. Bankruptcy court judge allows MarkAir to continue flying through Aug. 31 when it will have to show that it can fly profitably.

-- August 1, 1995:  FAA grounds MarkAir after maintenance concerns.

Destinations (1995)
The following MarkAir destination information is taken from their January 2, 1995 system timetable route map.  The airline was operating Boeing 737 jet service both in Alaska and in the lower 48 states in the U.S. at this time.

 Anchorage (ANC)
 Atlanta (ATL)
 Barrow (BRW)
 Bethel (BET)
 Chicago - Midway Airport (MDW)
 Cincinnati (CVG)
 Dallas/Ft. Worth (DFW)
 Denver (DEN)
 Dillingham (DLG)
 Dutch Harbor (DUT)
 Fairbanks (FAI)
 Juneau (JNU)
 Kansas City (MCI)
 King Salmon (AKN)
 Kodiak (ADQ)
 Kotzebue (OTZ)
 Las Vegas (LAS)
 Los Angeles (LAX)
 Minneapolis/St. Paul (MSP)
 New York City - LaGuardia Airport (LGA)
 Nome (OME)
 Oakland (OAK)
 Phoenix (PHX)
 Prudhoe Bay (SCC)
 Reno (RNO)
 San Diego (SAN) 
 Washington, D.C. - Dulles Airport (IAD)

Fleet
In March 1995, MarkAir's total fleet including MarkAir Express consisted of the following 68 aircraft: 
 8 Beechcraft 1900
 5 Boeing 737-200C (capable of being operated in combi aircraft mixed passenger/freight configuration)
 1 Boeing 737-200
 4 Boeing 737-300
 7 Boeing 737-400
 2 Cessna 172
 1 Cessna 185
 28 Cessna 207A
 3 Cessna 208 Caravan
 2 de Havilland Canada DHC-2 Beaver
 5 de Havilland Canada DHC-3 Otter
 2 de Havilland Canada DHC-7 Dash 7 (capable of being operated in combi aircraft mixed passenger/freight configuration)
 2 de Havilland Canada DHC-8-300 Dash 8 (operated from 1991 to 1993)

All of MarkAir's mainline operations at this time were operated with Boeing 737 jetliners.

MarkAir Express fleet
In March 1995, MarkAir Express' regional and small aircraft fleet consisted of the following 48 aircraft:

 5 Beechcraft 1900
 2 Cessna 172
 2 Cessna 185
 28 Cessna 207
 2 Cessna 208 Caravan
 2 de Havilland Canada DHC-2 Beaver
 5 de Havilland Canada DHC-6 Twin Otter
 2 de Havilland Canada DHC-7 Dash 7 (capable of being operated in combi aircraft mixed passenger/freight configuration)

All of these aircraft were in the fleet at some point in the past, however in March 1995, The Cessna 208 and DHC-7 Aircraft had been out of the fleet for several years

Accidents and incidents

A Boeing 737-2x6X, operating as MarkAir flight 3087 from Anchorage, crashed 7.5 miles short of runway 14 at Unalakleet Airport on June 2, 1990, injuring four, one of them (a flight attendant) seriously. There were no passengers in the aircraft, which was destroyed. No one was killed in the incident.

See also 
 List of defunct airlines of the United States

References

External links

 NTSB Aircraft Accident Report Flight 3087
 MarkAir Former Fleet Detail

1946 establishments in Alaska
1996 disestablishments in Alaska
Airlines disestablished in 1996
Airlines established in 1946
Airlines based in Alaska
Companies based in Anchorage, Alaska
Companies based in Denver
Defunct airlines of the United States
Defunct companies based in Alaska
Defunct companies based in Colorado